The Congregational Christian Church Samoa (CCCS) is an international evangelical Christian Church originally established in Samoa by missionaries of the London Missionary Society.

History 

CCCS traces its beginnings to the arrival in 1830 of missionaries sent by the London Missionary Society (LMS), accompanied by missionary teachers from Tahiti and the Cook Islands and a Samoan couple from Tonga.

The LMS missionaries arrived at a time of fierce warfare and fighting between local chiefs. Weary of violence and bloodshed, they readily received the missionaries and their gospel of peace.

Paramount chief, Malietoa Vainu'upo, of noble lineage accepted Christianity. All his followers and kinsfolk immediately followed suit. Similarly, Tui-Manu'a, the sovereign ruler of the Manu'a islands also embraced the LMS emissary. The Kingdom of Manu'a became a LMS and Congregational stronghold. Within a few years, virtually the whole of Samoa was converted to Christianity. Huge numbers of people from simple and noble lineage soon offered themselves for overseas mission work. In 1839, nine years after the arrival of the LMS, the first twelve Samoan missionaries left for mission work in Melanesia. Since then, Samoans continued to take the gospel message to other Pacific islands, e.g. Papua New Guinea, Vanuatu, Kiribati, Tuvalu, Niue, Tokelau, New Caledonia, Rotuma, Solomon Islands, Wallis and Futuna. Many of these early Samoan missionaries never returned home; they occupy many of the unnamed and unmarked graves on islands throughout the Pacific. By the 1980s Samoan missionaries could be found in Africa, evangelizing on the streets of London, and in remote villages of Jamaica.

Establishment of a theological college 
[Malua Theological College was established in 1844, its main objective to teach and educate local students so that each village of Samoa would have a theologically educated pastor as spiritual leader. By the end of the 19th century, a pattern of ministry had emerged. It was modeled on the Samoan village structural organization and aimed at preserving, as much as possible, the value systems of the Samoan way of life. The village congregation is the basic unit of the CCCS with the pastor as the spiritual leader.

Church's focus 

The Samoan church during the missionary period engaged itself in the "social redemption of humanity". This vision was based on the church's understanding of God's sovereignty. It saw the divine purpose of redemption not in individual terms only but also in corporate, social and political terms. The newly acquired faith had its focus on the transformation of life and society. This legacy remains a motivating force in the nation's idealism as well as in the church's commitment to be active in social efforts. This social endeavor is evident in the sphere of educating the children of Samoa. 
The CCCS maintains a strong focus on the importance of education. The church operates five secondary schools, a girls' secondary school, a vocational fine arts school and one theological college. The CCCS maintains a steady annual enrollment of 3,000 students. (http://cccs.org.ws/index.php/education)

Relationships with other churches 

Since the second half of the 20th century, the Samoan church has continued to forge ecumenical relationships with other churches locally, regionally and internationally. It has become an international church with eight districts (synod or diocese) outside Samoa: one in the United States, one in Hawaii, three in Australia and three in New Zealand. It has one congregation in Fiji and American Samoa. In the Independent state of Samoa alone the CCCS membership is over 70,000. In the U.S. Territory of American Samoa, the CCCAS has over 39,000 adherents. Samoan Congregational adherents account for nearly half of the Samoan population living abroad.

When the London Missionary Society combined with other missions to create the Council for World Mission (CWM) in 1977, the CCCS became a part of this global missionary effort as well. An ecclesial schism took place within the Samoan church in 1980, with the American Samoa district withdrawing and forming the Congregational Christian Church of American Samoa (CCCAS).  The CCCAS became a member of CWM in 1994.  The 2012 CWM Conference was held at the CCCAS headquarters in Kananafou. Fellow church members from over thirty-one Churches with LMS affiliations converged upon Kananafou to share in Christian fellowship.  Samoan Congregational churches continue to play an active role in participating in ecumenical efforts that outreach to the world.

Bible
Within the first years of mission work, the LMS missionaries developed a Samoan alphabet and put the language into written form. The setting-up of the first printing press in Samoa (1839), only the second in the Pacific region, was a mark of the missionary zeal to bring the people to understand the gospel through the written word.

The London Missionary Society missionaries, working with prominent and well-versed Samoan orators in the local vernacular, translated the Christian Bible into the Samoan language, and this Bible translation, "O le Tusi Pa'ia", is still  used today. It provides an important grounding in the philosophical usage of the Samoan language. By 1855 the translation of the Bible in Samoan was completed. The 1886 edition of the Samoan Bible was printed by the LMS in London. This edition used Roman numerals and the word, "Ieova", or Jehovah, in reference to the Lord throughout the Old Testament text. This edition is widely used among other Christian denominations that use the Samoan language.

In 1839, the LMS missionaries introduced a monthly journal, Sulu Samoa. The CCCS continues to print and provides online publication through its website - cccs.org.ws.

The London Missionary Society established a printing press (firstly in the village of Avao, Savaii and later transferred their printing work to Malua, Upolu). In 1844 a theological college was established at Malua, on Upolu island. In addition to the theological college, Malua continues to be the main centre of the Congregational Christian Church in Samoa; with its main offices in the main town of Apia, Samoa. The Congregational Christian Church in American Samoa (CCCAS) has its headquarters and theological training seminary at Kanana Fou (New Canaan) compound on Tutuila Island in the US territory of American Samoa.

References

External links

 Official website of the Christian Congregational Church of Samoa

Religion in Samoa
Religious organizations established in 1839
Congregationalism
1830s establishments in Samoa